Headquarters (commonly referred to as HQ) denotes the location where most, if not all, of the important functions of an organization are coordinated. In the United States, the corporate headquarters represents the entity at the center or the top of a corporation taking full responsibility for managing all business activities. In the United Kingdom, the term head office (or HO) is most commonly used for the headquarters of large corporations. The term is also used regarding military organizations.

Corporate

A headquarters is the entity at the top of a corporation that takes full responsibility for the overall success of the corporation, and ensures corporate governance. The corporate headquarters is a key element of a corporate structure and covers different corporate functions such as strategic planning, corporate communications, tax, legal, marketing, finance, human resources, information technology, and procurement. This entity includes the chief executive officer (CEO) as a key person and their support staff such as the CEO office and other CEO-related functions; the "corporate policy making" functions, including all corporate functions necessary to steer the firm by defining and establishing corporate policies; the corporate services encompassing activities that combine or consolidate certain enterprise-wide needed support services, provided based upon specialized knowledge, best practices, and technology to serve internal (and sometimes external) customers and business partners; and the bidirectional interface between corporate headquarters and business units.

Business unit
A headquarters normally includes the leader of a business unit and their staff, as well as all functions to manage the business unit and operational activities. The head of the business unit is responsible for overall result of the business unit.

Regional
A headquarters sometimes functions at the top of a regional unit, including all activities of the various business units, taking full responsibility for overall profitability and success of this regional unit.

Military

Military headquarters take many forms, depending on the size and nature of the unit or formation they command. Typically, they are split into the forward, main and rear components, both within NATO nations, and those following the organization and doctrine of the former Soviet Union (see Isby, 1988).

The forward or tactical HQs (known as 'tac' for short) is a small group of staff and communicators.  Usually very mobile, they exist to allow the commander to go forward in an operation, and command the key parts of it from a position where they can see the ground and influence their immediate subordinates.

The main HQs (known as 'main') is less mobile and is involved in both the planning and execution of operations. There are a number of staff assembled here from various staff branches to advise the commander, and to control the various aspects of planning and the conduct of discrete operations. A main HQ for a large formation will have a chief of staff (CoS) who coordinates the staff effort; in a smaller HQ this may be done by the second-in-command.

The rear or logistic HQs ('rear') is some distance from the battle or front line in conventional operations.  Its function is to ensure the logistical support to front line troops, which it does by organizing the delivery of combat supplies, materiel and equipment to where they are needed, and by organizing services such as combat medicine, equipment recovery, and repair.

Religious

The headquarters of the Catholic Church is Vatican City. The World Headquarters of Jehovah's Witnesses is relocated in Warwick, New York, from its former location, Brooklyn, New York. The headquarters of the Russian Orthodox Church is in Danilov Monastery, Moscow. The World Council of Churches, including Orthodox Churches, has its headquarters in Geneva, Switzerland. The headquarters of Ecumenical Patriarch of Constantinople is located in Istanbul, Turkey. The headquarters of the Church of Jesus Christ of Latter-day Saints is located in Salt Lake City, Utah. The Anglican Communion Office is in London.

Martial arts

In Japanese budō martial arts such as karate, judo, aikido, kendo, etc., there is usually a headquarters for each organization or region. The Japanese word honbu (本部) is generally used for that, also outside Japan. Sometimes they refer to these headquarters as honbu dojo (本部道場) in which dojo (道場) is a facility provided for practicing discipline, the training ground. Sometimes honbu is written as hombu, the way it is pronounced, but the Hepburn transcription is honbu in which the 'n' is a syllabic n.

Notes

References

 Isby, David C. (1988) Weapons and Tactics of the Soviet Army Jane's, London: 516 pp.
 Wanner, Herbert (2006) Global and regional corporate headquarters in: Kählin, Christian, H. (Editor): Switzerland Business & Investment Handbook; Orell Füssli and Wiley.
 Wanner, Herbert; LeClef, Xavier, & Shimizu, Hiroshi (2004) Global Headquarters on the Move: From Administrators to Facilitators Prims Second Semester 2004; Arthur D. Little.

 
Organizational structure
Military locations